United Nations Security Council Resolution 213, adopted unanimously on September 20, 1965, after examining the application of Singapore for membership in the United Nations, the Council recommended to the General Assembly that Singapore be admitted.

See also
List of United Nations Security Council Resolutions 201 to 300 (1965–1971)

References

Text of the Resolution at undocs.org

External links
 

 0213
History of Singapore
Foreign relations of Singapore
 0213
 0213
September 1965 events